Douglas County, Kansas, maintains an extensive network of county highways to serve the rural areas and state parks of the county. It is one of a handful of Kansas counties to do so.

The major county highways are set up on a grid. East–west-oriented roads have a three-digit number beginning with the numeral "4" and ending in an even digit. The further north the road, the lower the number; the further south, the higher the number. North–south-oriented roads have a four-digit number beginning with "10" and ending in an odd digit. The further west the road, the lower the number; the further east, the higher the number.

There are also minor county roads with one or two digits that travel a short distance or serve a state park.

None of the county highways enters Lawrence, the county seat.

Lists

Major east–west oriented roads

Major north–south oriented roads

Minor county highways

See also

References

County highways
Lists of roads in Kansas